Hoffman Brook is a river in Delaware County, New York. It flows into North Branch Basket Creek north-northeast of Basket.

References

Rivers of New York (state)
Rivers of Delaware County, New York